Just the Way You Like It is the only full-length studio album by American contemporary R&B singer Tasha Holiday (following her debut EP, The Acapellas). Released March 25, 1997 via MCA Records, the album did not chart on the Billboard 200 but it peaked at #91 on the Billboard R&B chart.

Two singles were released from the album: "Just the Way You Like It" and "So Real, So Right" / "Just One Night". "Just the Way You Like It" was Holiday's only song to chart on the Billboard Hot 100, peaking at #93 in 1997.

Track listing

Chart positions

Samples

References

External links
 
 

1997 debut albums
Contemporary R&B albums by American artists
MCA Records albums